Magnus Aarbakke (born 14 October 1934 in Tysnes, Hordaland) is a Norwegian judge.

He was born in Tysnes. He took the Dr.juris degree in 1967 for the thesis Virksomhetsbegrepet i norsk skatterett, and was a professor at the University of Oslo from 1968 to 1990. He specialized in commercial law, and was among the editors of the journal Tidsskrift for rettsvitenskap between 1974 and 2001. After leaving the professorship he worked as a lawyer for some years, and then served as a Supreme Court Justice from 1994 to 2002. He is a member of the Norwegian Academy of Science and Letters. On May 31, 1996 Aarbakke received an honorary doctorate from the Faculty of Law at Uppsala University, Sweden

References

1934 births
Living people
People from Tysnes
Supreme Court of Norway justices
Norwegian legal scholars
Academic staff of the University of Oslo
Members of the Norwegian Academy of Science and Letters